Séamus Lynch (born February 1941) is an Irish retired hurler who played as a left wing-back for club side St. Vincent's and at inter-county level with the Dublin senior hurling team.

Honours

Dublin
Leinster Senior Hurling Championship (1): 1961

References

1941 births
Living people
St Vincents (Dublin) hurlers
Dublin inter-county hurlers